Kiyomitsu (written: 清光, 清允 or 清満) is a masculine Japanese given name. Notable people with the name include:

, Japanese footballer
, Japanese voice actor
, Japanese painter and printmaker

Japanese masculine given names